Alice Alanna Cashin  (6 March 1870 – 4 November 1939) was an Australian nurse during World War I.

Early life and education
Alice Alanna Cashin was born on 6 March 1870 in Melbourne, daughter of boot-maker Richard and Catherine Cashin (née Meehan). Her mother died the following year. The family moved to Sydney, where Cashin was educated at a private ladies college. Her father was later acknowledged as pioneer of IOOF in New South Wales.

Cashin completed her nursing training at St Vincent’s Hospital in Darlinghurst, before working as a private nurse. In July 1901 she joined the Australasian Trained Nurses’ Association.

In 1909 Cashin sailed to England to develop her skills in therapeutic massage.

War service 
Shortly after the outbreak of World War I she was nursing in France with the British Red Cross.

In 1915 she joined Queen Alexandra’s Imperial Military Nursing Service Reserve. She was put in charge of a hospital’s surgical ward in Ras-el-din, Egypt. While there, she was twice mentioned in dispatches before being awarded the Royal Red Cross in January 1917.

In June 1916 she was transferred to HMHS Gloucester Castle where she was matron of the hospital ship. On 30 March 1917 the ship was torpedoed by a German U-boat. Before seeking rescue herself, she ensured that all the wounded soldiers on board as well as the nurses in her charge were transferred from the ship. Only three of the 399 passengers were killed. For this, she was awarded a bar to the Royal Red Cross.

Her next posting was two years as matron of the 400-bed Lichfield Military Hospital from 7 May 1917. As well as the fur cape, muff and cap given by Queen Alexandra to all members of the Imperial Military Nursing Service Reserve, Cashin's service was acknowledged by the nursing staff of Lichfield Hospital who presented her with a gold link bracelet, inscribed with her war record.

Post war 
In 1924, representing the Diggers, she took part in a competition to raise funds for the Marrickville Anzac Memorial Hall. She was named Queen of Marrickville, receiving 75,346 votes, well ahead of Mrs Cruse (48,186) and Mrs Harris (42,369).

She died intestate on 4 November 1939 at her home in Marrickville of chronic nephritis. Her funeral mass was held at St Bridget’s Catholic Church, before her burial at Woronora cemetery. She had never married.

References 

1870 births
1939 deaths
Australian military nurses
Members of the Royal Red Cross
Australian women of World War I